The 1984 State of the Union Address was given by the 40th president of the United States, Ronald Reagan, on January 25, 1984, at 9:00 p.m. EST, in the chamber of the United States House of Representatives to the 98th United States Congress. It was Reagan's third State of the Union Address and his fourth speech to a joint session of the United States Congress. Presiding over this joint session was the House speaker, Tip O'Neill, accompanied by George H. W. Bush, the vice president.

The speech lasted 43 minutes and 2 seconds and contained 4931 words. The address was broadcast live on radio and television.

The Democratic Party response was delivered by Senator Joe Biden (DE), Sen. David Boren (OK), Senator Carl M. Levin (MI), Senator Max S. Baucus (MT), Senator Robert Byrd (WV), Senator Claiborne Pell (RI), Senator Walter Huddleston (KY), Rep. Dante B. Fascell (FL), Rep. Tom Harkin (IA), Rep. William Gray (PA), House Speaker Thomas O’Neill (MA), and Rep. Barbara Boxer (CA).

Samuel Pierce, the Secretary of Housing and Urban Development, served as the designated survivor.

See also
Speeches and debates of Ronald Reagan
1984 United States presidential election

References

External links

 (full transcript), The American Presidency Project, UC Santa Barbara.
 1984 State of the Union Address (video) at C-SPAN
 Full video and audio, Miller Center of Public Affairs, University of Virginia.

State of the Union addresses
State union 1984
98th United States Congress
State of the Union Address
State of the Union Address
State of the Union Address
State of the Union Address
January 1986 events in the United States
Articles containing video clips